Elections for the post of mayor of Chișinău were held on 10 July, 24 July, 27 November, and 11 December 2005.

July Election 

Elections for the post of mayor of Chișinău on 10 July 2005 have been declared invalid, as they participated in only 27% of voters. The by-election on 24 July 2005 was attended by only 19,8% of voters. These elections were also declared invalid because of the participation of less than one-third of voters on the electoral lists.

November–December Election 

Following elections were held on 27 November 2005. 22,42% of the voters was not enough to recognize the election. Another attempt to elect the mayor of the capital was made on 11 December 2005. At this time the polls were 22.62% of the inhabitants of Chişinău. The mayor was not elected. From 2005 to 2007 mayor was Vasile Ursu. On 25 January 2007 Vasile Ursu was appointed Minister of Transport and acting mayor of Chișinău became Veaceslav Iordan, former deputy of Ursu.

Results

References

External links 
 Local elections in Chisinau invalidated again
 Results of parliamentary elections in Chisinau Municipality

2005 in Moldova
Local elections in Moldova
2005 elections in Moldova
21st century in Chișinău